Xavier de Roux (4 December 1940 – 5 June 2015) was a French politician.

He was a member of the Radical Party and a deputy for the department Charente-Maritime in the National Assembly of France from 1993 until 1997 and from 2002 until 2007. From 1983 until his death in 2015 he was the elected mayor of Chaniers, a small town in Charente-Maritime.

References

1940 births
2015 deaths
People from Boulogne-Billancourt
Radical Party (France) politicians
Mayors of places in Nouvelle-Aquitaine
Union for a Popular Movement politicians
Deputies of the 12th National Assembly of the French Fifth Republic
Union of Democrats and Independents politicians